Baskerville is an English surname of Anglo-Norman origin.  It is believed to have been used by Norman invaders from Bacqueville (Bacqueville-en-Caux, Sancte Mariae de Baschevilla 1133; Baschevillam, Baskervilla 1155, Baccheville 1176, Bascervilla 1179) in Normandy, many of whom settled along the English-Welsh border.

At the time of the British Census of 1881, its relative frequency was highest in Herefordshire (16.2 times the British average), followed by Cheshire, Devon, Radnorshire, Oxfordshire, Brecknockshire, Cornwall, Wigtownshire, Carmarthenshire and Staffordshire.  It has also been corrupted to Basketfield in some families.

The name Baskerville may refer to:
 Albert Henry Baskerville (1882–1908), a New Zealand pioneer of rugby league football
 Charles Baskerville (1870–1922), American chemist
 Charles Baskerville (1896–1994), American painter, son of the above
 Howard Baskerville (1885–1909), an American missionary, revered as the "American Lafayette" in Iran
 Sir John Baskerville, a Royalist during the English Civil Wars
 John Baskerville (1706–1775), typographer
 John David Baskerville (1857–1926), a Canadian politician
 Lorrainne Sade Baskerville, an American social worker and activist
 Ralph de Baskerville, son of Robert de Basqueville who held Eardisley Castle in Herefordshire

Fiction 
 William of Baskerville, a fictional character in The Name of the Rose by Umberto Eco.
 In The Hound of the Baskervilles, Conan Doyle suggests the family are of Irish descent. Sir Henry Baskerville has 'the rounded head of the Celt which carries inside it a Celtic enthusiasm and power of attachment'.
 A prominent group of characters in the Japanese manga Pandora Hearts uses the surname.

See also 
 Baskerville typeface
 Baskerville (disambiguation)
 The Hound of the Baskervilles
 The Hound of the Baskervilles (disambiguation)

References 

English-language surnames
Surnames of Norman origin